The Strathglass Park District, located in Rumford, Maine, encompasses one of the nation's finest early 20th-century mill worker housing complexes.  Funded by Hugh J. Chisholm, owner of Rumford's paper mill, and designed by Cass Gilbert, the district encompasses a collection of 50 high quality brick duplexes, of similar yet varied construction, which were built in 1901-2 on a series of tree-lined streets, with a small park at the center.  As of the district's listing on the National Register of Historic Places in 1974, only one of the Gilbert-designed houses had been destroyed.  The company divested itself of the houses in the late 1940s, with most being sold to their occupants.

Description
The Strathglass Park District is located in central Rumford, bounded by Lincoln Avenue, Hancock Street, Maine Avenue, and York Street.  The main access to the area is via a stone gate off Maine Avenue, which quickly radiates out into three nearly-parallel streets, which are terminated to the north at Clachan Place.  There is a narrow park near the northern end on Lochness Road, the central of the three main roads.   All of the houses in this complex are duplexes, built of brick.  Stylistically they are essentially variant of the Shingle style, but elements of Queen Anne and Dutch Revival styling are also to be found.  The brick was locally manufactured, while the slate for the roofs was brought on from Vermont and Pennsylvania by train.

The walls were built with hollow internal spaces, improving their ability to insulate.  The interiors were generously sized, a notable contrast to the cramped quarters often found elsewhere in worker housing.  The houses were provided with hardwood floors, simplifying cleaning, and with electricity provided for a nominal fee by Chisholm's Rumford Falls Power Company.

Hugh J. Chisholm began developing his paper works at Rumford in the 1880s.  Having seen the condition and poor quality of worker housing in large industrial cities, he decided to attract workers by providing higher-quality accommodations, hiring New York City architect Cass Gilbert to design the buildings.  Chisholm named his development "Strathglass", after the Strathglass River in Scotland, which ran near his family's ancestral seat.  The street names in the district are also Scottish in origin.

When the houses were ready for occupancy, the company allotted them to employees recommended by their foremen.  It only charged minimal rent, to cover operating expenses and amortization.  The company provided snow removal services, lawn mowing, and rubbish removal.  The company divested itself of the properties in 1948-49, with most of the houses purchased by their occupants.

See also
National Register of Historic Places listings in Oxford County, Maine

References

Shingle Style architecture in Maine
Buildings and structures completed in 1902
Buildings and structures in Oxford County, Maine
Historic districts on the National Register of Historic Places in Maine
Rumford, Maine
National Register of Historic Places in Oxford County, Maine